Arthur Basset (1597 – 7 January 1673) was an English politician who sat in the House of Commons from 1625 to 1626.

Basset was the son of Sir Robert Basset of Umberley, a colonel in the army. He subscribed at the University of Oxford on 11 June 1613 and was awarded BA from Exeter College, Oxford on 8 February 1616. He was a student of the Inner Temple in 1617 when he was of High Hampton, Devon. In 1625, he was elected Member of Parliament for Fowey. He was re-elected MP for Fowey in 1626.
 
Basset died in January 1673. His grandson, John, was his principle heir due to the death of his eldest son in 1660.

References

1597 births
1673 deaths
Members of the Parliament of England for Fowey
Alumni of Exeter College, Oxford
Members of the Inner Temple
Arthur
English MPs 1625
English MPs 1626